William Augustus Brevoort Coolidge (August 28, 1850 – May 8, 1926) was an American historian, theologian and mountaineer.

Life
Coolidge was born in New York City as the son of Frederic William Skinner Coolidge, a Boston merchant, and Elisabeth Neville Brevoort, sister of James Carson Brevoort and Meta Brevoort. He studied history and law at St. Paul's School in Concord, New Hampshire, at Elizabeth College, Guernsey, and at Exeter College, Oxford. In 1875, he became a Fellow of Magdalen College, Oxford. From 1880 to 1881 he was professor of British history at Saint David's College in Lampeter and in 1883 he became a priest of the Anglican church.

In 1870 at the age of twenty he was made a member of the Alpine Club. Coolidge was one of the great figures of the so-called silver age of alpinism, making first ascents of the few significant peaks in the Alps that had not been climbed during the golden age of alpinism. On many of these climbs he was accompanied by his aunt, Meta Brevoort, and a pet dog, Tschingel, given to him by one of his guides, Christian Almer.

In 1885 he moved to Grindelwald, Switzerland, where he died in 1926.

First ascents in the Alps

Piz Badile, 27 July 1867, with François Devouassoud and Henri Devouassoud
Ailefroide, 7 July 1870, with Christian Almer and Ulrich Almer
Central peak of La Meije, 1870, with Meta Brevoort and three guides
Unterbächhorn, 1872
First winter ascent of the Jungfrau, January 1874, with Christian and Ulrich Almer
West summit of Les Droites, 16 July 1876, with Christian and Ulrich Almer
Pic Coolidge, July 1877 with Christian and Ulrich Almer
Les Bans, 14 July 1878, with Christian and Ulrich Almer
Southern Peak of the Aiguilles d'Arves, 22 July 1878, with Christian and Ulrich Almer
Monte Matto, 14 July 1879, with Christian and Ulrich Almer
Aiguille de Chambeyron, 1879, with Christian Almer.
Scherbadung, 1886
 Chüebodenhorn, 1892

Selected publications

References

 Ronald W. Clark: An Eccentric in the Alps: The story of W. A. B. Coolidge, the Great Victorian Mountaineer. Museum Press, London 1959

External links

 

1850 births
1926 deaths
Alumni of Exeter College, Oxford
American Anglicans
American mountain climbers
19th-century English Anglican priests
Fellows of Magdalen College, Oxford
People educated at Elizabeth College, Guernsey
Writers from New York City
American Christian theologians
Anglican theologians
American emigrants to England
Christians from New York (state)
American emigrants to Switzerland
People from Grindelwald